This a list of episodes for NWA USA, a weekly professional wrestling series produced by the National Wrestling Alliance (NWA). Each season focuses on storylines leading into the NWA's pay-per-view events.

Series overview

List of NWA USA episodes

Season 1: Crockett Cup 2022

Season 2: Alwayz Ready

Season 3: NWA 74

Season 4: Hard Times 3

Season 5: Nuff Said

Season 6: NWA 312

References

External links
 Official NWA website
 Official NWA YouTube channel

2022 American television series debuts
2020s American television series
National Wrestling Alliance shows
American professional wrestling television series
American non-fiction web series
English-language television shows
YouTube original programming